Acacia conjunctifolia is a shrub belonging to the genus Acacia and the subgenus Juliflorae. It is native to parts of northern Australia.

Description
The green linear to narrowly elliptic or narrowly oblanceolate shaped phyllodes occur singly or in clusters of two to four.
It blooms between May and September producing pale yellow flowers. After flowering erect and linear seed pods form that are straight to slightly curved.

Taxonomy
The species was first formally described by the botanist Ferdinand von Mueller in 1879 in the work Fragmenta Phytographiae Australiae. It was reclassified as Racosperma conjunctifolium by Leslie Pedley in 1987 before being reverted to the genus Acacia in 2001.

It is thought to be closely related to Acacia amentifera.

Distribution
It is found through the top end of the Northern Territory and a small area in north western Queensland where it grows in stony and sandy soils usually on laterite or quartzite aa a part of Eucalypt woodlands or scrubby open forest communities. 
In Western Australia it is found in small area of the Kimberley region where it grows on sandstone outcrops above creek beds.

See also
List of Acacia species

References

conjunctifolia
Acacias of Western Australia
Taxa named by Ferdinand von Mueller
Plants described in 1879
Flora of the Northern Territory
Flora of Queensland